is a 1983 Japanese film directed by Kichitaro Negishi.

Synopsis
Naomi is a rich university student about to leave on a trip to America. Her father hires detective Shuichi Tsujiyama to watch over her, a situation that pleases neither Naomi or Shuichi. Things get complicated when Shuichi's ex-wife is suspected in the murder of a love hotel manager. Naomi and Shuichi join up to investigate the murder which may involve yakuza gangsters.

Cast
 Hiroko Yakushimaru as Naomi Arai
 Yūsaku Matsuda as Shuichi Tsujiyama
  as Yukiko Naoki
 Kyōko Kishida as Kimie Hasenuma
  as Yutaka Nagai
  as Masako Shindo
  as Wada
  as the Love hotel manager
 Susumu Fujita as Gozo Kunizaki

Background
Detective Story, director Negishi's third mainstream film, was based on a novel by mystery writer Jirō Akagawa. Lead actor Yūsaku Matsuda also played the role of a detective (Shunsaku Kudo) in the 1979-1980 TV series Tantei Monogatari (Detective Story) but the film is unrelated to the TV series. The film was released in Japan on VHS tape in December 1989, and as a DVD in December 2000.

Reception
It became the number two Japanese film on the domestic market in 1983, earning ¥2.8 billion in distributor rental income, behind Antarctica, and also the second highest-grossing Japanese film of all time.

Awards and nominations
8th Hochi Film Award 
 Won: Best Actor – Yūsaku Matsuda

References

External links
 
 
 

1983 films
Films directed by Kichitaro Negishi
1980s Japanese-language films
Toei Company films
Films with screenplays by Haruhiko Arai
1980s Japanese films